Cibyra zischkai is a species of moth of the family Hepialidae. It is known from Bolivia.

References

External links
Hepialidae genera

Hepialidae
Endemic fauna of Bolivia
Invertebrates of Bolivia
Moths of South America
Moths described in 1961